Pavlo Oleksandrovych Kyrylenko (born 5 May 1986) is a Ukrainian prosecutor and politician. He is the current Governor of Donetsk Oblast. Under martial law during the 2022 Russian invasion of Ukraine, Kyrylenko has served as the Head of the Donetsk Regional Military Administration.

Biography 
In 2008, he graduated from the Yaroslav Mudryi National Law University. In July 2008, he was employed at the Prosecutor's Office of Ukraine. From September 2017 to July 2019, Kyrylenko was the military prosecutor of the Uzhhorod garrison in the Western region.

Kyrylenko is a Lieutenant Colonel of Justice.

Personal life 
Kyrylenko is married and has two children.

References

External links 
 
 

1986 births
Living people
People from Makiivka
Yaroslav Mudryi National Law University alumni
Ukrainian prosecutors
Governors of Donetsk Oblast
Independent politicians in Ukraine
21st-century Ukrainian lawyers
21st-century Ukrainian politicians
People of the 2022 Russian invasion of Ukraine